Below is a list of current female world boxing champions recognised by the WBA, WBC, IBF, WBO, and The Ring.

Each champion's professional boxing record is shown in the following format: wins–losses–draws–no contests (knockout wins).

Heavyweight (175+ lb, 79.4+ kg) 

|align="center" style="background:#bacdec"|
|align="center"style="text-align:center;"|Hanna Gabriels21–2–1 (12 KO)
|align="center"|vacant
|align="center"|vacant
|align="center" style="background:#bacdec"|
|}

Light heavyweight (175 lb 79.4 kg) 

|align="center"style="text-align:center;"|Hanna Gabriels21–2–1 (12 KO)April 17, 2021
|align="center" style="background:#bacdec"|
|align="center"|vacant
|align="center"|vacant
|align="center" style="background:#bacdec"|
|}

Super middleweight (168 lb, 76.2 kg) 

|align="center"|Franchón Crews-Dezurn8–1–0–1 (2 KO)April 30, 2022
|align="center"|Franchón Crews-Dezurn8–1–0–1 (2 KO) September 13, 2018
|align="center"|Franchón Crews-Dezurn8–1–0–1 (2 KO)April 30, 2022
|align="center"|Franchón Crews-Dezurn8–1–0–1 (2 KO)September 14, 2019
|align="center"|Franchón Crews-Dezurn8–1–0–1 (2 KO)April 30, 2022
|}

Middleweight (160 lb, 72.6 kg) 

|align="center"|Claressa Shields13–0 (2 KO)June 22, 2018
|align="center"|Claressa Shields13–0 (2 KO)November 17, 2018
|align="center"|Claressa Shields13–0 (2 KO)June 22, 2018
|align="center"|Claressa Shields13–0 (2 KO)October 15, 2022
|align="center"|Claressa Shields13–0 (2 KO)April 13, 2019
|}

Light middleweight, junior middleweight, super welterweight (154 lb, 69.9 kg) 

| style="text-align:center;"|Terri Harper13–1–1 (6 KO)September 24, 2022
| style="text-align:center;"|Natasha Jonas13–2–1 (8 KO)September 3, 2022
| style="text-align:center;"|Natasha Jonas13–2–1 (8 KO)November 12, 2022
| style="text-align:center;"|Natasha Jonas13–2–1 (8 KO)February 19, 2022
|align="center"|vacant
|}

Welterweight (147 lb, 66.7 kg) 

|align="center"|Jessica McCaskill12–3 (5 KO)August 15, 2020
|align="center"|Jessica McCaskill12–3 (5 KO)August 15, 2020
|align="center"|Jessica McCaskill12–3 (5 KO)August 15, 2020
|align="center"|Jessica McCaskill12–3 (5 KO)August 15, 2020
|align="center"|Jessica McCaskill12–3 (5 KO)March 13, 2021
|}

Light welterweight, junior welterweight, super lightweight (140 lb, 63.5 kg) 

|align="center"|Chantelle Cameron17–0 (8 KO)November 5, 2022
|align="center"|Chantelle Cameron17–0 (8 KO)October 4, 2020
|align="center"|Chantelle Cameron17–0 (8 KO)October 30, 2021
|align="center"|Chantelle Cameron17–0 (8 KO)November 5, 2022
|align="center"|Chantelle Cameron17–0 (8 KO)October 30, 2021
|}

Lightweight (135 lb, 61.2 kg) 

|align="center"|Katie Taylor22–0 (6 KO)October 28, 2017
|align="center"|Katie Taylor22–0 (6 KO)June 1, 2019
|align="center"|Katie Taylor22–0 (6 KO)April 28, 2018
|align="center"|Katie Taylor22–0 (6 KO)March 15, 2019
|align="center"|Katie Taylor22–0 (6 KO)June 1, 2019
|}

Super featherweight, junior lightweight (130 lb, 59 kg) 

|align="center"|Alycia Baumgardner14-1 (5 KO)February 4, 2023
|align="center"|Alycia Baumgardner14–1 (7 KO)November 13, 2021
|align="center"|Alycia Baumgardner14–1 (7 KO)October 15, 2022
|align="center"|Alycia Baumgardner14–1 (7 KO)October 15, 2022
|align="center"|Alycia Baumgardner14–1 (7 KO)October 15, 2022
|}

Featherweight (126 lb, 57.2 kg) 

|rowspan= 2 align="center"|Amanda Serrano44-2–1 (3 KO)February 4, 2023
|align="center"|Amanda Serrano44–2–1 (30 KO)February 4, 2021
|rowspan= 2 align="center"|Amanda Serrano44–2–1 (30 KO)September 24, 2022
|align="center"|Amanda Serrano44–2–1 (30 KO)February 19, 2020
|rowspan= 2 align="center"|Amanda Serrano44–2–1 (30 KO)September 24, 2022
|}

Super bantamweight, junior featherweight (122 lb, 55.3 kg) 

|rowspan="2" align="center"|Mayerlin Rivas16–4–2 (10 KO)February 7, 2020
|align="center"|Yamileth Mercado19–3 (5 KO)November 16, 2019
|rowspan="2" align="center"|Cherneka Johnson14–1 (6 KO)April 20, 2022
|rowspan="2" align="center"|Débora Dionicius35-4 (6 KO)December 23, 2022
|rowspan="2" align="center"|vacant
|-
|align="center"|Kudakwashe Chiwandire5–2–1 (4 KO)February 26, 2022
|}

Bantamweight (118 lb, 53.5 kg) 

|align="center"|Nina Hughes5–0 (2 KO)November 26, 2022
|align="center"|Yulihan Luna24–3–1 (34KO)October 31, 2020
|align="center"|Ebanie Bridges9–1 (3 KO)March 26, 2022
|align="center"|Dina Thorslund17–0 (7 KO)June 25, 2021
|align="center"|vacant
|}

Super flyweight, junior bantamweight (115 lb, 52.2 kg) 

|rowspan="2" align="center"|Clara Lescurat7–0 (3 KO)June 24, 2022
|align="center"|Asley Gonzalez Macias15–2 (7 KO)October 1, 2022
|rowspan="2" align="center"|Micaela Luján10–1–1 (3 KO)January 30, 2021
|rowspan="2" align="center"|Mizuki Hiruta4-0(0 KO)December 1, 2022
|rowspan="2" align="center"|vacant
|-
|align="center"|Adelaida Ruiz12–0–1 (6 KO)September 8, 2022
|}

Flyweight (112 lb, 50.8 kg) 

|align="center"|Marlen Esparza12–1 (1 KO)April 9, 2022
|align="center"|Marlen Esparza13–1 (1 KO)June 19, 2021
|align="center"|Arely Muciño32–3–2 (11 KO)October 29, 2022
|align="center"|Gabriela Celeste Alaniz13–0 (5 KO)June 18, 2022
|align="center"|Marlen Esparza12–1 (1 KO)April 9, 2022
|}

Light flyweight, junior flyweight (108 lb, 49 kg) 

|align="center"|Jessica Nery Plata29–2 (3 KO)March 11, 2022
|align="center"| Jessica Nery Plata29–2 (3 KO)January 13, 2023
|align="center"|vacant
|align="center"|vacant
|align="center"|vacant
|}

Strawweight, mini flyweight, minimumweight (105 lb, 47.6 kg) 

|align="center"|Seniesa Estrada23–0 (9 KO)March 20, 2021
|align="center"|Tina Rupprecht12–0–1 (3 KO)September 30, 2018
|align="center"|Yokasta Valle27–2 (9 KO)August 4, 2019
|align="center"|Yokasta Valle27–2 (9 KO)September 8, 2022
|align="center"|vacant
|}

Atomweight, junior mini flyweight, light minimumweight (102 lb, 46.3 kg) 

|align="center"|Monserrat Alarcón17–4–2 (0 KO)August 31, 2018
|align="center"|Fabiana Bytyqi19–0–2 (5 KO)September 22, 2018
|align="center"|Mika Iwakawa11–6–1 (3 KO)September 1, 2022
|align="center"|20–7–2 (9 KO)September 1, 2022
|align="center"|vacant
|}

See also

 List of current world boxing champions
 List of WBA female world champions
 List of WBC female world champions
 List of IBF female world champions
 List of WBO female world champions
 Women Boxing Archive Network

References

Female
Women's boxing
Lists of women boxers